Pompu is a comune (municipality) in the Province of Oristano in the Italian region Sardinia, located about  northwest of Cagliari and about  southeast of Oristano.

Pompu borders the following municipalities: Curcuris, Masullas, Morgongiori, Simala, Siris. It is home to the Nuragic archaeological site of Prabanta.

References

Cities and towns in Sardinia